Lehrman or Lehrmann is a surname. Notable people with the surname include:

Cassidy Lehrman (born 1992), American actress
Daniel S. Lehrman (1919–1972), American naturalist, animal psychologist, ornithologist and comparative psychologist
Debra Lehrmann (born 1956), American jurist
Gregg Lehrman, American composer, music producer and songwriter
Henry Lehrman (1881–1946), American actor, screenwriter and film director and producer
Julius Lehrmann (1885–1962), Danish sports shooter
Leonard Lehrman (born 1949), American composer
Lewis Lehrman (born 1938), investment banker, supports the study of American history from a conservative perspective
Robert Lehrman, American novelist, commentator, speechwriter, Democratic aide, and teacher

See also
 Lerman (disambiguation)
Lehrman Community Day School, a Jewish day school in Miami Beach, Florida
Gerson Lehrman Group (GLG), founded in 1998 and headquartered in New York City, independent consulting services
Gilder Lehrman Center for the Study of Slavery, Resistance, and Abolition, Yale University
Gilder Lehrman Institute of American History, founded in New York in 1994, was set up to promote the study and love of American history

Jewish surnames
Yiddish-language surnames